William O'Conner Jr. (born January 2, 1987) is an American college baseball coach and former catcher. O'Conner is the head coach of the Xavier Musketeers baseball team. O'Conner played college baseball at the Indiana University for coach Tracy Smith before transferring to the Xavier University to play for coach Scott Googins from 2008 to 2009.

Playing career
O'Conner attended Elder High School in Cincinnati, Ohio. O'Conner then enrolled at the Indiana University, to play college baseball for the Indiana Hoosiers baseball team.

As a freshman at the Indiana University in 2006, O'Conner had a .176 batting average, a .233 on-base percentage (OBP) and a .206 SLG.

As a sophomore in 2007, O'Conner batted .310 with a .310 SLG, 9 hits, and 9 RBIs.

In the 2008 season as a junior, O'Conner transferred to the Xavier University to play for the Xavier Musketeers baseball team and hit 5 doubles and 21 RBIs.

O'Conner had his best season as a senior in 2009, with home runs (2) and was a key contribute with RBIs (39), batting average (.333) and slugging (.412). He was named Honorable mention All-Atlantic 10 Conference baseball tournament Team.

Coaching career
O'Conner joined the Xavier coaching staff as a volunteer coach in 2011. He stayed with the Musketeers through the 2012 season. O'Conner joined the Northern Kentucky Norse baseball staff as a volunteer coach in 2013. He re-joined the Xavier staff in 2013 as a full-time assistant. O'Conner spent 4 seasons as an assistant for the Xavier baseball staff.

Xavier
In June 2017, O'Conner was named the head coach of the Musketeers program. O'Conner lead the Musketeers to a 21–35 finish in his first season.

Head coaching record

See also
 List of current NCAA Division I baseball coaches

References

External links

 Northern Kentucky Norse bio
 Xavier Musketeers bio

Living people
1987 births
Baseball catchers
Xavier Musketeers baseball players
Indiana Hoosiers baseball players
Arizona League Rangers players
Spokane Indians players
Washington Wild Things players
Northern Kentucky Norse baseball coaches
Xavier Musketeers baseball coaches
Elder High School alumni
Baseball players from Cincinnati
Baseball coaches from Ohio